Count Duckula is a British children's animated comedy horror television series created by British studio Cosgrove Hall Films and produced by Thames Television as a spin-off from Danger Mouse, a series in which an early version of the Count Duckula character was a recurring villain. Count Duckula aired from 6 September 1988 to 16 February 1993 across four series; in all, 65 episodes were made, each about 22 minutes long. All have been released on DVD in the UK, while only the first series has been released in North America.

A new version of Count Duckula appeared in the 2015 reboot series of Danger Mouse.

History

Count Duckula was created by British studio Cosgrove Hall Films as a spin-off from Danger Mouse. In 1984, Nickelodeon acquired the US broadcast rights to Danger Mouse, which became a hit for the channel. After a few years, the Nickelodeon management came to Cosgrove Hall wishing to co-produce a new series. After being shown a number of ideas, the then head of Nickelodeon, Gerry Laybourne, spotted a picture of Count Duckula in Brian Cosgrove's office, and said, "That's the one I want". As the series went into production, one of the writers suggested he become a vegetarian, which added an even sillier concept to the series.

Plot

Several episodes explore the theme that each resurrection creates a new incarnation with little to no memory of its past life, the immediate past incarnation referred to as the current's "father". Thus, every incarnation is free to develop its own personality and pursue its own personal interests.  The vampire is able to pose as a "dreadful dynasty, the counts of Duckula". The preceding generations included knights, sorcerers, scientists, artists, Egyptologists and even professional gamblers, all of whom are also secretly "vicious vampire ducks".

As the title sequence puts it, "the latest reincarnation did not run according to plan". The successful conclusion of the ritual, which was to be performed "once a century, when the moon is in the 8th house of Aquarius", requires blood, the source of sustenance for any vampire, but Nanny accidentally substitutes ketchup.  Consequently, the newest version is not a blood-sucking vampire, but a vegetarian one.  He is more interested in juicy carrots than hunting for victims.  Igor is appalled.  Even worse, his "new" master is obsessed with pursuing wealth and fame as an entertainer.

The stories often revolve around Duckula's adventures in search of riches and fame, assisted by the castle's ability to teleport around the world.  Another regularly occurring theme is the repeated attempt by Igor to turn Duckula into a proper vampire.  Some episodes feature Duckula's nemesis Doctor Von Goosewing (based on Dr. Abraham Van Helsing, the nemesis of Dracula), a vampire hunter who blindly refuses to believe the current incarnation of Duckula is harmless.  There is also an array of bizarre, often supernatural foes, from zombies to mechanical werewolves.  Another feature of the show is a cuckoo clock whose bat-like Borscht Belt comedian styled characters come out and make jokes about the current situation (or corny jokes in general).  The clock is also a vital part of the castle's traveling mechanism, and it even has the ability to turn back time.

A series of annuals and monthly comics further detailing the adventures of Count Duckula and associated characters were released throughout the time that the series originally aired and for a short time afterwards.

Voice cast
Count Duckula, played by David Jason
Igor, played by Jack May
Nanny, played by Brian Trueman
Dr. Von Goosewing, played by Jimmy Hibbert
Dimitri, played by Trueman
Sviatoslav, played by Hibbert
Narrator, played by Barry Clayton
Various other characters played by Clayton, Hibbert, Jason, May, Trueman and Ruby Wax
Theme song vocalists were Doreen Edwards and Mike Harding

Characters

Count Duckula
Count Duckula is a short green duck with black parted hair and the traditional vampire evening wear, and speaks with a hybrid British-American accent. He has no fangs, and his favourite food, as a vegetarian, is broccoli sandwiches.

He has a very modern outlook, and often despairs over the traditional vampire image he is expected to embody. He hates living in a dark, gloomy castle, and finds the behaviour of his servants to be depressing. Duckula frequently expresses frustration with Igor's attempts to change him back into a proper vampire and his lecturing Duckula as a disgrace and disappointment to the Duckula lineage. Although he retains some vampiric powers and qualities (such as teleportation and an image invisible to mirrors), he also possesses a lesser power, seen only once, which is the ability to create a lightning flash when angry. He often goes outside in the daytime without suffering any ill effects, but this is likely because of his not being a fully "traditional" vampire. In the episode "Doctor Goosewing and Mr. Duck", Count Duckula briefly turns into a "proper" vampire, desiring blood from the villagers outside the castle (much to Igor's great delight), due to a serum slipped to him by von Goosewing that he presumed would make Duckula harmless, but he turns away from the door when he discovers that the sun is still out and is returned to normal by night.

Duckula's personality is good-natured and caring, always trying to help the villagers in need, often with mixed results. Despite his nobility, inherited castle, and devoted staff, he is often destitute to the point of being penniless, with several episodes pointing out that he struggles to pay essentials (such as claiming that he hasn't been able to pay his light bill since the day he was resurrected).  As a result of being perpetually broke, Count Duckula is prone to short-lived obsessions, usually in order to become rich and famous. These obsessions form the plots for episodes, such as attempting to become a blues musician in New Orleans or prospecting for gold.

The character differs considerably from his predecessor on the Danger Mouse series. The only similarity, other than the name, is they are both vampire ducks with ambitions in show business and little actual talent. The previous version was an evil villain, willing to blackmail and force his way into stardom (as opposed to the current Count, who merely tries to get in the legitimate way) and was fixated on being a TV star, rather than settle for fame in some other branch of entertainment. The original depiction of Duckula has far greater magical powers and makes more common use of them. He has a thick accent consisting of lisping, stuttering and occasional squawks. Most notably, he was not a vegetarian in the Danger Mouse version. In his very first appearance, he threatened to drink Danger Mouse's blood, only to be chased away by the sun. The Danger Mouse Duckula was destroyed and fell to ashes, resurrected during the 8th astronomical house of Aquarius. During his recent appearance in the 2015 reboot, the new Duckula is a mix of the original and the vegetarian version from his spin-off.

Marvel Comics (via their Star Comics imprint) produced a comic series based on Count Duckula, and introduced an additional difference between this incarnation of Duckula which separated him from his predecessors. Due to ketchup being used in the resurrection ceremony, this version of Duckula has ketchup, rather than blood, flowing through his veins. This was discovered when Duckula was given a blood test in order to get a passport into a fictional country which produced a salad which Duckula was obsessed with getting to eat. In the same issue, Duckula, Nanny, and Igor were photographed as a means of formal ID for said country; however, due to the classic stereotype of vampires not appearing in film, Duckula did not appear in the photo which was taken. Duckula also gained a romantic interest in the Star Comics run; Vanna Von Goosewing, who turned out to be the niece of his long time adversary Dr. Von Goosewing. The attraction was mutual, and the two continued their relationship though the majority of the series after their introduction, though Vanna did not always appear in every issue of the book.

Igor
Igor, the Count's butler, is a traditional horror servant based on the stock character Igor, and adds a decidedly dark streak to some of the show's humour. He greatly dislikes his master's behaviour, and often encourages him to act in a far more ghastly manner. Although he will generally obey Duckula's specific orders, he remains convinced that, if he could only talk Duckula into biting, maiming, torturing and otherwise brutalising people, he would return to the "good old days" of the previous counts who behaved more like evil vampires. Igor hates words such as "bless you", "nice", "good", and "lovely". Such words make him cringe, since he prefers the darker and more sinister side of life. In "Dr Goosewing and Mr Duck" when he accidentally drinks the carpet stain removal liquid created by Goosewing, his personality changes to an overly sweet-natured demeanour, and he becomes eager to help Goosewing destroy Duckula.

He is a hunched, balding, cultured vulture with a deep, slow voice and delights in the macabre. In the episode "Arctic Circles", he states that he has served for "seven-and-a-half centuries", indicating that Igor is himself either immortal, or extremely long-lived through some unknown means. It is unknown if the 7.5 centuries constitutes the totality of the 17-count Duckula dynasty, or if Igor has only served the most recent few incarnations. The episode "Dear Diary" implies that the Duckula dynasty is in excess of 2,000 years old, by stating that exposure to sunlight would fry the extant count into "a 2,000-year-old pile of dust." However the episode "The Rest is History" contradicts this, by implying that not only has Igor indeed been with the dynasty since the very first Count Duckula, he is also responsible for the first count becoming a vampire, as a figure who is virtually identical to the modern Igor of the show in both appearance and voice conspires to have the first Duckula be bitten by a bat. The exact reasons for this are unknown, however his attempts are ultimately successful, much to the chagrin of the modern Duckula.

Nanny
Nanny is Duckula's nanny and housekeeper. She is an extremely large and clumsy hen with a very strong Bristolian accent and her right arm inexplicably always in a sling, possessing incredible strength and inevitably messing up whatever task she is set to do. The episode "No Sax Please, We're Egyptian" reveals that Nanny's clumsiness actually resulted in the death of three former chambermaids of Castle Duckula, though this happenstance is quickly dismissed by the characters as they were only part-time employees. Nanny has a blind spot regarding doors, and often crashes through a door without opening it first, or (more commonly) walks right through the wall a few feet off from the door's position. Not surprisingly, she is the one who mistakes ketchup for blood in Duckula's current resurrection. The episode "Prime Time Duck" reveals her first name to be Amnesia. Nanny may herself also be immortal, as—in the episode "Dear Diary"—she's seen alongside Igor, serving the Count's great-grandfather, in a flashback set more than a century prior to the show's present day.

She is supremely unintelligent, completely unreliable, but utterly devoted to her "Ducky-boos," as she calls Duckula, and has a deep maternal affection for him, although her clumsiness often inadvertently causes him harm. A recurring gag is her inability to understand what people around her are talking about. She often mixes up words and takes insult at conversations not directed at her. In "Dr Goosewing and Mr Duck" when she accidentally drinks the carpet stain removal liquid created by Goosewing, she becomes extremely intelligent.

Castle Duckula
Count Duckula's home is an archetypal Transylvanian castle with all the trimmings: dungeon, torture chamber, library of macabre texts, laboratory, and more.  The castle is also home to an often referred-to, but never seen, werewolf named Towser, which Duckula does not believe exists (he often refers to it as "the werewolf we don't have"). The castle can teleport to any place on earth (and beyond), but returns automatically at dawn, "Eastern Transylvanian Standard Time".  The teleportation is activated when Duckula enters an upright coffin while he states where he wants it to take him (often, he will have to come up with a rhyme to activate it properly). The controls to this device are inside an old-fashioned cuckoo clock that hangs on the wall. The controls have two live mechanical bats, Dmitri and Sviatoslav, who are known for bad puns and jokes. Duckula himself, throughout the entire series never notices them except in the episode "The Rest is History".

Dr. Von Goosewing
Dr. Von Goosewing is a mad scientist and vampire hunter, a spoof of Abraham Van Helsing. He is a goose that speaks in a German accent, and wears an outfit not unlike that of Sherlock Holmes. He pursues Count Duckula relentlessly, never able to comprehend that Duckula is actually completely harmless. He is a terrible scientist, often getting maimed by his own crackpot inventions, he is supremely unobservant, and often bumps into Duckula and converses with him for several minutes without realizing to whom he is speaking.

Goosewing appears to have an assistant named Heinrich (he never appears on screen), whom he often calls out and blames his failures on him. In fact, "Heinrich" appears to be just a figment of Goosewing's imagination, an imaginary friend. However, the comic book version of the characters by Marvel reveal that Heinrich is actually his former assistant who is always complaining about his paltry wages.

The Marvel Comics run also introduced Vanna Von Goosewing, who was stated to be Von Goosewing's niece. Vanna and Duckula's reciprocal romance further infuriated Goosewing, as he now believed that Vanna was under some form of mental manipulation, assuming it to be the only reason she would have any interest in Duckula. This belief made him all the more intent on destroying Duckula as he now considered his mission to have a personal component to it, believing Duckula to be a threat to Vanna's safety. In an alternate universe depicted in the final issue of the comic, Goosewing is stated to have succeeded in destroying the counterpart Duckula of that reality, indicating it to be the reason why the 'regular' Duckula of the series had no reflection, and leaving Igor and Nanny without anyone to serve until the next time the resurrection ritual could be performed.

The Crow Brothers
The Crow Brothers are four criminally-inclined crows named Ruffles, Burt, Junior, and the masked brother (according to a comic in a Count Duckula annual).  They typically scale the walls of Castle Duckula with the aid of climbing equipment.  They are always seen hanging off one another with the use of bungee cords to climb the walls of whatever building they plan to scale.  Their goal is to get at the treasure inside the castle, but they will rarely make it to the top.

Gaston and Pierre
Gaston and Pierre are a pair of French criminals and occasional villains.  Although they are both undeniably incompetent, the arrogant Gaston is ostensibly the "brains" of the outfit.  Gaston is a tall, thin, black stork, while Pierre is a short, stubby parakeet who sounds similar to Bluebottle from The Goon Show.  The characters were adapted into non-bird form for yet another Cosgrove-Hall animated series, Victor and Hugo.

Pirate Penguins
A ruthless crew of piratical penguins originally hired by Count Duckula, this crew of seafarers turn on Count Duckula when his antics crash their ship.  All of the penguins are typical pirate stereotypes, one of which is known as Mr. Mate and shouts that he will "bite their heads off!"

Narrator

The Narrator (Barry Clayton) opens and closes every episode. Episodes usually began with him describing Castle Duckula and its gloomy atmosphere, and close with him saying a phrase popularised in the 1950s and 1960s by American TV horror host John Zacherle, "Goodnight out there ... WHATever you are!" The Narrator finishes with evil laughter that leads into the end credits. Variants of The Narrator's closing line are also used to close certain programmes.

Relatives
Duckula has numerous vampiric relatives all over the world, who are more classic vampires than Duckula, possessing fangs, red eyes and evil personalities.  Only a small number, such as Don Diego, show any affinity or friendship toward the benign Count Duckula.

They come from many different countries, such as Spain and Scotland, and their costumes represent their native cultures.  The relatives include Don Diego, a Spanish vampire duck who makes his fun and games by burning down villages, and Rory McDuckula, a Scottish vampire duck who later makes himself an enemy of Duckula. Another relative, the Archduck Merganser, was a famous Egyptologist. "Uncle Bloodbath" is also mentioned a few times.

The Peasants

The town situated below Castle Duckula is home to many peasants who live in constant fear of the count, despite his harmless current incarnation.  A recurring joke in the series and associated books is that "the peasants are revolting".  Their local pub is called The Tooth and Jugular.  The regulars are often seen singing a variation of the traditional song "One Man Went to Mow a Meadow!" replacing the words "mow a meadow" with "kill a vampire".

Towser

Towser is the werewolf kept secretly in the dungeons of Castle Duckula. Never seen on-screen, he is sometimes heard howling and growling off-screen. This frequently leads to Igor denying Towser's existence in the castle to the ever-suspicious Duckula who  of the werewolf.

Episodes

Spin-off

In a move mirroring Duckula's adaptation from Danger Mouse, the characters of Gaston and Pierre were reinvented and given a spinoff series as the now-human Victor and Hugo.

Home media

DVD releases
The Count Duckula discs are in Region 0, PAL format. The first series was released on Region 1 DVD on 4 October 2005. A Spanish format for Latin America was released.

Complete set

Individual series

Individual episodes

VHS releases
During the show's original run, Count Duckula episodes were released on numerous VHS titles from Thames Video collection, often in a different sequence than what was shown in the TV.

This VHS title appeared in 1990 but, at the time, the episodes contained were somewhat exclusive to video (the first was not televised until 1991, neither was the latter until 1993).

Count Duckula episodes were also released on special VHS compilations with episodes of other series. In 1989, the episode "Down under Duckula" was released on Thames' VHS title More Children's Summer Stories, with episodes from Danger Mouse and The Wind in the Willows.  In 2001, in the twilight years of VHS, the episodes "The Ghost of Castle McDuckula" and "Venice a Duck, Not a Duck!" were featured on two cult kids' collection tapes, with episodes of Rainbow, Chorlton & the Wheelies, Button Moon and Jamie & the Magic Torch.

Comics
Between 1988 and 1991 Marvel Comics distributed 15 issues of Count Duckula comics.

Count Duckula appeared in North American comics under Star Comics (an imprint of Marvel Comics) and introduced an additional difference between this incarnation of Duckula which separated him from his predecessors. Due to ketchup being used in the resurrection ceremony, this version of Duckula has ketchup, rather than blood, flowing through his veins. This was discovered when Duckula was given a blood test in order to get a passport into a fictional country which produced a salad which Duckula was obsessed with getting to eat. In the same issue, Duckula, Nanny, and Igor were photographed as a means of formal ID for said country; however, due to the classic stereotype of vampires not appearing in film, Duckula did not appear in the photo which was taken. Duckula also gained a romantic interest in the Star Comics run; Vanna Von Goosewing, who turned out to be the niece of his long time adversary Dr. Von Goosewing. The attraction was mutual, and the two continued their relationship through the majority of the series after their introduction, though Vanna didn't always appear in every issue of the book.

In Germany, a separate adaptation was produced under license as Graf Duckula, with script by Peter Mennigen and artwork by Miroslava Pollmer and Rüdiger Pareike.

Audiobooks
In the early 1990s at least two episodes were released in audiobook format on cassette tape with accompanying illustrated hardcover book featuring artwork from the original television episodes.  They featured the original cast in new performances as they were edited considerably from the original television scripts for a shorter duration, removal of visual gags and the addition of new narration and character exposition where necessary.  The "Restoration Comedy" episode was packaged with a small plastic Count Duckula figure in some territories.

 No Sax Please, We're Egyptian
 Restoration Comedy
 The Ghost of Castle McDuckula

Computer games
Alternative Software released a computer game based on Count Duckula called "No Sax Please, We're Egyptian!". In the game, Igor, Nanny and Count Duckula have decided to search the tomb of the great Pharaoh Upanatem (a pun on "up and at 'em") to find the mystic saxophone.  What they do not know is that they have brought along some unwanted guests in the form of the Crow brothers.

The game was a basic jump and run platform-type game.  At the start, the castle was transported to an ancient pyramid. Then, players had a set amount of time to go through the pyramid, evading the various baddies inside the pyramid, to retrieve the mystic sax before the Count's castle automatically returns to Transylvania, leaving the player stranded in Egypt.

The title of the game was a parody on the title of a British comedy play No Sex Please, We're British!.

The game was available for various 8-bit computers such as the ZX Spectrum, Commodore 64, & Amstrad CPC, and was also released as a "Kid's Pack" with other TV shows that Alternative Software turned into games, including "Postman Pat," "Sooty and Sweep," "Popeye 2," "The Wombles," and "Superted".  Alternative Software was one of the few software companies of the 1980s that still survives today as an independent software producer.

There was also a Count Duckula 2 sequel in 1992.

See also
 List of vampire television series
 Vampire film

References

External links

 
 
 

1988 British television series debuts
1993 British television series endings
1980s British animated television series
1980s British children's television series
1980s Nickelodeon original programming
1990s British animated television series
1990s British children's television series
1980s British black comedy television series
1990s British black comedy television series
British children's animated adventure television series
British children's animated comedy television series
British children's animated fantasy television series
British children's animated horror television series
British horror comedy television series
Dark fantasy television series
English-language television shows
Danger Mouse
ITV children's television shows
Nickelodeon original programming
YTV (Canadian TV channel) original programming
Duckula
Duckula
Duckula
Duckula
Duckula
Television shows produced by Thames Television
Television series by Cosgrove Hall Films
Television series by FremantleMedia Kids & Family
Animated television series about ducks
British television spin-offs
Television shows adapted into comics
Vampires in animated television
Vegetarianism in fiction
Television series about vampires
Vampires in television